Jessica Alexander (born 19 June 1999) is an English actress and model. She gained prominence through her role in the BBC iPlayer and Netflix series Get Even (2020). She made her feature film debut with Glasshouse and A Banquet (both 2021). In 2023, she was named a Bright Young Thing by Tatler.

Career
Alexander first auditioned for a film at 14 years old. She starred in the short films Necktie (2013), directed by Yorgos Lanthimos for Venice 70: Future Reloaded, as well as Truck (2016). She made her television debut in the 2018 Italian Disney Channel teen dramedy Penny on M.A.R.S. as Lucy Carpenter, the antagonist of the first two series. That same year, she was scouted by Select Model Management. She also signed with Next. In 2020, she gained recognition for her role as Olivia Hayes in the iPlayer teen thriller series Get Even.

In 2021, Alexander starred as Bee in the South African dystopian thriller Glasshouse, directed by Kelsey Egan whom Alexander had met through a previous project. She also starred as Betsey in the British horror film A Banquet, directed by Ruth Paxton, alongside Sienna Guillory and Ruby Stokes.

In March 2021, it was announced Alexander would be joining the cast of the 2023 live-action film adaptation of Disney's 1989 The Little Mermaid as Vanessa. In July 2022, she appeared in the Kate Cox-directed thriller film Into the Deep alongside Matthew Daddario and Ella-Rae Smith. The film was released in the UK on Sky Cinema. She has an upcoming role in the Globoplay series Fallen.

Filmography

Film

Television

Short

References

External links
 

Living people
1999 births
21st-century English actresses
Actresses from London
Models from London
Next Management models
People educated at Putney High School
People from the London Borough of Richmond upon Thames
Select Model Management models